The 2017–18 Pro50 Championship was the sixteenth edition of the Pro50 Championship, a List A cricket tournament that was played in Zimbabwe. The tournament included a new team, the Rising Stars, along with the existing four teams. Matabeleland Tuskers were the defending champions.

The competition was originally scheduled to run from 1 December 2017 to 31 March 2018. However, in December 2017, Zimbabwe Cricket postponed all the remaining fixtures scheduled to take place in the tournament. Zimbabwe Cricket were struggling to pay players' salaries for November and December and wanted to upgrade their facilities for the 2018 Cricket World Cup Qualifier, which took place in Zimbabwe in March 2018. Initially, the tournament did not resume after the Cricket World Cup Qualifier, with only the first round of fixtures taking place. However, in April 2018, Zimbabwe Cricket confirmed that the tournament would restart, with the remaining rounds of the competition to be played during April, May and June 2018. After a gap of more than four months, the second round of fixtures resumed on 17 April 2018.

Following the conclusion of the penultimate round of fixtures, both Rising Stars and Mountaineers advanced to the final, after the defending champions, Matabeleland Tuskers, failed to secure a bonus point with their victory over Mountaineers. In the final, Rising Stars beat Mountaineers by 144 runs to win their first title.

Points table
The following teams competed in the tournament:

 Advanced to the final

Fixtures

Round 1

Round 2

Round 3

Round 4

Round 5

Round 6

Round 7

Round 8

Round 9

Round 10

Final

References

External links
 Series home at ESPN Cricinfo

2017 in Zimbabwean cricket
2018 in Zimbabwean cricket
Pro50 Championship
Pro50 Championship